Ballpark Village may refer to:

Dayton Ballpark Village, the former name of the Water Street District in Dayton, Ohio
St. Louis Ballpark Village